The Miss Hong Kong 2009 pageant, the 37th Miss Hong Kong pageant was held in the Hong Kong Coliseum on August 22, 2009. Ten delegates completed for the title. The winner was Sandy Lau and she competed  at Miss World 2010, but not Miss Chinese International 2010, because the pageant was postponed until after Sandy Lau crowned her successor. The first runner-up was Germaine Li, and she represented Hong Kong in the Miss International 2010 pageant. The second runner-up was Mizuni Hung.

Result

Placements

Special awards

Swimsuit Competition Scores

 Winner
 First Runner-up
 Second Runner-up

(#) Ranking

Delegates
The Miss Hong Kong 2009 delegates were:

Post-Pageant Notes
Sandy Lau unplaced in Miss World 2008 in Johannesburg, South Africa. 
Germaine Li unplaced in Miss International 2009 in Chengdu, China. But awarded Miss Charm.
Miss Hong Kong 2008 Edelweiss Cheung was not invited to crown her successor. Instead, TVB invited Miss Hong Kong 1977 Loletta Chu to crown for Miss Hong Kong 2009  Sandy Lau .

External links
Official Site

2009 in Hong Kong
Miss Hong Kong Pageants
2009 beauty pageants